La Rinconada Hippodrome is a race track for Thoroughbred horse racing located in Coche, a neighborhood of south Caracas, Venezuela.  It was designed by Arthur Froehlich and opened on July 5, 1959. This track is the #1 course in the country known to host a number of major races with some of the best jockeys in the world participating every year.

Some of the important races held here annually include:
 Clásico Internacional Propietarios de La Rinconada (Grade 1) 
 Gran Premio Clásico Simón Bolívar (Grade 1)
 Clásico Fuerza Armada Bolivariana (former Clásico Fuerzas Armadas)
 Clásico Antonio Jose de Sucre
 Copa Internacional Cruz del Avila
 Clásico Republica de Venezuela
 Clásico Internacional Jockey Club de Venezuela (Gr. 1)

On the race track grounds is also the Poliedro de Caracas as well as the Alejandro Otero Museum (Museo de Artes Visuales Alejandro Otero).

References
  Information on Hipodromo La Rinconada

Horse racing venues in Venezuela
Sports venues in Caracas
1959 establishments in Venezuela